The University of Toulon (French: Université de Toulon or UTLN) is a French university located in Toulon, France, and neighboring areas (La Garde, Saint-Raphaël, La Valette and Draguignan). It was founded in 1968 and is organized in 6 faculties, 2 autonomous institutes, an institute of business management and an engineering school.

Unités de Formation et de Recherche
In the French system, an UFR ("Unité de formation et de recherche") or Research and Education Unit offers both undergraduate and graduate programs. Each UFR is governed by a director elected from the department and heads over a council of elected professors who control its curriculum.

The University of Toulon has 6 U.F.R.:
Science (UFR Sciences et Techniques)
Undergraduate level: Mathematics, Applied Mathematics, Biology, Computer Science and Physics/Chemistry.
Graduate level: Mathematics, Computer Science, Physics and Engineering Science, Chemistry.
Arts (UFR Lettres et Sciences Humaines)
French, English (Language, Literature and History or "Langues, Littérature et Civilisation"), Spanish, applied Modern Languages ("Langues Etrangères Appliquées").
Tourism ("Management de projets touristiques durables") and Culture ("Management de projets artistiques et culturels").
Law (UFR de Droit)
Economy (UFR Sciences Economiques et de Gestion)
Sport (UFR STAPS)
Multimedia (Institut Ingémédia)

Institutes and Schools
Engineering School: Institut des Sciences de l'Ingénieur de Toulon et du Var (ISITV, now Seatech)
Business School: Institut d'Administration des Entreprises

University Institutes for Technology
IUT de Toulon
IUT de Saint-Raphaël

Research Centers

Mathematics
IMATH - Institut de Mathématiques de Toulon
Earth Science
LSEET - Laboratoire de Sondages Electromagnétiques de l'Environnement Terrestre - UMR 6017
PROTEE - Processus de Transferts et d'Echanges dans l'Environnement
Physics and Chemistry
MAPIEM - Matériaux Polymères Interfaces Environnement Marin (EA 4323 MAPIEM)
IM2NP - Institut Matériaux Microélectronique Nanosciences de Provence - UMR CNRS 6242
Physics and Engineering
CPT - Centre de Physique Théorique - UMR 6207 (jointly with Aix-Marseille University and the CNRS)
Humanities
BABEL - Laboratoire Babel
i3M - Information, Milieux, Médias, Médiations
Political Science and Law
CDPC JEAN-CLAUDE ESCARRAS - Centre de Droit et de Politique Comparés - UMR CNRS 6201
CERC - Centre d'Etudes et de Recherche sur les Contentieux
Economics
ERMMES - Laboratoire d'Etudes et de Recherche Méditerranéennes en Management des Entreprises
LEAD - Laboratoire d'Économie Appliquée au Développement
Health and Biology
HANDIBIO : Laboratoire de Biomodélisation et ingénierie des handicaps
Communication Science
LSIS - Laboratoire des Sciences de l'Information et des systèmes
Engineering
SNC - Systèmes Navals Complexes - ERTA

Notable people
Faculty
 Boris Cyrulnik (born 1937, in Bordeaux) - psychiatrist
 Olivier Dubuquoy (born 1974) - geographer, documentarist and environmental activist
 Fabien Matras (born 1984) - lawyer; politician

Alumni
 Maryse Joissains (born 1942, in Toulin) - politician (LR)
 Gearóid Ó hAllmhuráin (born 1955) - Irish ethnomusicologist, author, musician and historian specialising in Irish music, diaspora, cultural and memory studies
 Maurizio Porfiri (born Rome, Italy) - engineering professor, noted for his work with robotic fish and aquatic research
 Sonia Krimi (born 1982, in Tunis) - politician (LREM)

See also
 List of public universities in France by academy

References

Toulon-Var, University of the South
Toulon-Var, University of the South
Universities and colleges in Toulon
Law schools in France